Peggy Butler (23 September 1897 – 15 December 1971) was a British fencer. She competed at the 1928 and 1932 Summer Olympics.

References

External links
 

1897 births
1971 deaths
British female fencers
Olympic fencers of Great Britain
Fencers at the 1928 Summer Olympics
Fencers at the 1932 Summer Olympics
Sportspeople from London